Gergő Nagy may refer to:

Gergő Nagy (footballer) (born 1993), Hungarian footballer
Gergő Nagy (ice hockey) (born 1989), Hungarian ice hockey player